Artesunate/sulfadoxine/pyrimethamine is an artesunate-based oral medication used to treat malaria. It consists of artesunate and sulfadoxine/pyrimethamine.

References

Antimalarial agents